Guy Gordon Gosselin (born January 6, 1964) is an American professional ice sled hockey coach and former ice hockey defenseman. He was drafted in the eighth round, 159th overall, by the Winnipeg Jets in the 1982 NHL Entry Draft.

Gosselin played five games in the National Hockey League with the Jets in the 1987–88 season in Jersey #5. He was scoreless with six penalty minutes.

Since 2017, Gosselin has been the head coach of the United States men's national ice sledge hockey team. He coached the American team that went on to win a gold medal in para ice hockey at the 2018 Winter Paralympics in PyeongChang, South Korea.

Career statistics

Regular season and playoffs

International

Awards and honors

References

External links
 

1964 births
Living people
American men's ice hockey defensemen
Ice hockey players from Minnesota
Ice hockey players at the 1988 Winter Olympics
Ice hockey players at the 1992 Winter Olympics
Kansas City Blades players
Minnesota Duluth Bulldogs men's ice hockey players
Moncton Hawks players
Olympic ice hockey players of the United States
Skellefteå AIK players
Sportspeople from Rochester, Minnesota
Winnipeg Jets (1979–1996) draft picks
Winnipeg Jets (1979–1996) players